Çaparlı or Chaparly may refer to:
Çaparlı, Agsu, Azerbaijan
Çaparlı, Shamkir, Azerbaijan